Halls is a plural of the word hall.

Halls may also refer to:

People
 Walter Halls (1871–1953), British trade unionist and politician
 Ethel May Halls (1882–1967), American actress 
 Julian Halls (born 1967), British field hockey player 
 Evelyn Halls (born 1972), Australian fencer
 Roxana Halls (born 1974), English artist
 Monty Halls (born 1976), British marine biologist and TV presenter 
 John Halls (born 1982), English footballer, mostly played for Stoke, Brentford and Aldershot, and model
 Andy Halls (born 1992), English footballer, has played for Stockport, Macclesfield and Chester
 Halls (footballer) (born 1999), Brazilian footballer
 Henrique Halls (born 2002), Brazilian footballer

Places
 Halls, Georgia, an unincorporated community
 Halls, Missouri, an unincorporated community
 Halls, Tennessee, a town in West Tennessee
 Not to be confused with Halls Crossroads, Tennessee, a suburb of Knoxville sometimes colloquially referred to as "Halls"

Business
 Halls (cough drop), a brand of cough drop
 Geo. Hall & Sons, a defunct Australian soft drink company
 Halls (department store), Kansas City, Missouri, United States